Smak 86. is the sixth studio album by the Serbian band Smak, released in 1986. It was released as LP.

Track listing

Personnel 
 Boris Aranđelović - vocals
 Radomir Mihajlović "Točak" - guitar
 Milan Đurđević - keyboards
 Zoran Milanović - bass
 Slobodan Stojanović "Kepa" - drums

External links

Smak albums
1986 albums
Serbian-language albums